Mariann Gajhede Knudsen (born 16 November 1984) is a retired Danish footballer who last played as a central midfielder for Linköpings FC of Sweden's Damallsvenskan. She won over 100 caps for the Danish national team, before announcing her retirement from international football in November 2014 and making a brief comeback the following year. She was named Danish Player of the Year in 2008. In 2017, she joined the  Norwegian national team as fitness coach and physiotherapist to the team.

Club career
Gajhede Knudsen represented Fortuna Hjørring in both legs of the 2003 UEFA Women's Cup Final, a 1–7 aggregate defeat by Umeå IK of Sweden. After being named 2008 Danish Player of the Year, she was nearly forced into retirement in 2009, when a blood clot on her leg kept her out for approximately twelve months.

In November 2010 Gajhede Knudsen brought eight years and 215 matches with Fortuna Hjørring to an end and signed for Linköpings. She was cup-tied for the remainder of LFC's 2010–11 UEFA Women's Champions League campaign. She won the 2016 Damallsvenskan league championship with Linköpings, then retired as the successful squad broke up at the end of the season.

International career
Gajhede Knudsen made her senior international debut in October 2003, in a 6–1 win over Belgium. She went on to play at UEFA Women's Euro 2005 in North West England and the 2007 FIFA Women's World Cup in China. An anterior cruciate ligament injury kept Gajhede Knudsen out of UEFA Women's Euro 2009.

She was named in national coach Kenneth Heiner-Møller's Denmark squad for UEFA Women's Euro 2013. In Denmark's opening group match against hosts Sweden Gajhede Knudsen gave her team the lead in an eventful 1–1 draw.

In November 2014, exhaustion and niggling injuries caused Gajhede Knudsen to reluctantly withdraw from national team selection, allowing her to focus on club football.

References

External links

 
 
 Danish football stats  at DBU 
 
 

1984 births
Living people
Danish women's footballers
Denmark women's international footballers
Fortuna Hjørring players
Danish expatriate women's footballers
Danish expatriate sportspeople in Sweden
Expatriate women's footballers in Sweden
Linköpings FC players
Damallsvenskan players
People from Skagen
FIFA Century Club
Women's association football midfielders
2007 FIFA Women's World Cup players
Sportspeople from the North Jutland Region